
Nadezhda Ivanovna Zabela-Vrubel (  in Kovno –  in Saint Petersburg) was an Imperial Russian opera singer, the niece of the Russian sculptor Parmen Zabela. Vocally, she is best described as a lyrical (coloratura) soprano, with a particularly high tessitura.

In 1891 she graduated from the Saint Petersburg Conservatory, having been in the class of Natalia Iretskaya. She also studied in Paris with Mathilde Marchesi. She sang her debut in 1893 at the I. Setov operatic troupe in Kiev. In the season 1894–95 she sang in Tiflis, in 1895–96 in the St Petersburg Private opera, and in 1896–97 in Kharkov. During 1897–1904 she was a leading soprano in Savva Mamontov's Private Russian Opera. In 1904–11 she became the soloist of the Mariinsky Theatre in St Petersburg.

In 1896 she married the Russian artist Mikhail Vrubel, who created a series of her portraits.

Roles
Her roles include:
Gorislava in Ruslan and Ludmila;
Tatiana in Eugene Onegin;
Maria in Mazeppa;
Volkhova  in Sadko;
Swan Princess in The Tale of Tsar Saltan;
Snegurochka in The Snow Maiden;
Marfa in The Tsar's Bride;
Princess in Kashchey the Deathless;
Fevronia in Kitezh;
Margarita in Faust;
Nedda in Pagliacci;
Desdemona in Otello,  and many others.

Gallery

Quotations
"Always so reasonable and sober-minded, Rimsky-Korsakov fell head over heels in love with Nadezhda. Marriage was out of the question, though, because he had a talented and very intelligent wife and growing up kids in St.Petersburg and Nadezhda was married to the outstanding Russian artist Mikhail Vrubel. For many years Nadezhda Zabela-Vrubel and her inimitable voice inspired the composer to write a whole constellation of beautiful arias that immortalized Rimsky-Korsakov’s name and also that of the woman he loved so much..." (Musical Tales)

Bibliography
Nikolai Rimsky-Korsakov – Pимский-Корсаков Н.А., Летопись моей музыкальной жизни, 7 изд., М., 1955 
Rimsky-Korsakov, A. N. –  Pимскии-Коpсаков А. Н., Н. А. Римский-Корсаков. Жизнь и творчество, вып. 4, М., 1937. с. 117-23, 153-70; 
Yankovsky, M.. – Янковский М., Н. И. Забела М.- Л., 1953.

References

External links

Musical Tales: Cherchez la Femme. 
Mikhail Vrubel: Portrait of Nadezhda Zabela-Vrubel, the Artist's Wife (1898). 
Mikhail Vrubel Portrait of Nadezhda Zabela-Vrubel. 
Belcanto: Nadezhda Zabela-Vrubel. 
Narod: Nadezhda Zabela-Vrubel. 

1868 births
1913 deaths
Russian operatic sopranos
Ukrainian operatic sopranos
Musicians from Kaunas
19th-century women opera singers from the Russian Empire
Ukrainian people in the Russian Empire
Nadezhda